Árpád Soós may refer to:
 Árpád Soós (zoologist)
 Árpád Soós (footballer)